Dauzat-sur-Vodable is a commune in the Puy-de-Dôme department in Auvergne-Rhône-Alpes in central France.

References

Dauzatsurvodable
Puy-de-Dôme communes articles needing translation from French Wikipedia